Phoma draconis is a fungal plant pathogen.

See also 
 List of foliage plant diseases (Agavaceae)

References

External links 
 Index Fungorum
 USDA ARS Fungal Database

Fungal plant pathogens and diseases
draconis
Fungi described in 1983